The Brutal Language is the fourth full-length album released by the metal band My Ruin. Metal Express Radio described the lyrics as evil but with a humorous side.

Track listing
 "Nature Boy" - 1:13
 "Silverlake 6571" - 4:38
 "The Devil Walks" - 3:44
 "Spilling Open" - 3:48
 "Cold Hands Warm Heart" - 3:53
 "Metamorphosis - 4:42
 "Summer of Hell" - 4:11
 "Vince Vaughn" - 3:02
 "Imitation of Christ" - 4:05
 "Touch Me I'm Sick" (Mudhoney cover) - 2:56

Personnel
 Tairrie B - vocals
 Mick Murphy - guitars, bass guitar, drums, keyboards on "Nature Boy", backing vocals on "Touch Me I'm Sick", producer
 Nick Raskulinecz - mixer, mastering

References

My Ruin albums
2005 albums